Melanotus punctolineatus, commonly known as the sandwich click beetle, is a species of beetle from the family Elateridae and the genus Melanotus.

Description
The color of a body, legs, and antennas are black. The body is also elongated. The elytron is tapering, which is more noticeable among males. Males have longer antennas and prothorax than females.

References

Beetles described in 1829
Elateridae